The gilded triggerfish or blue-throated triggerfish, Xanthichthys auromarginatus, is a spotted gray triggerfish. Males of the species have blue cheeks and yellow-bordered, white fins. It is widely, but locally, distributed at islands in the Indo-Pacific.

In the aquarium 
Unlike most triggerfish, it is rarely aggressive towards other fish.   This fish usually does not attack any sessile invertebrates, but may eat ornamental shrimp.

References
FishBase Species Summary
Coral Reef Network: Xanthichthys auromarginatus

External links
 

Balistidae
Fish of Hawaii
Fish described in 1832